Grant John James Sheen (born 21 June 1974) is an English cricketer.  Sheen is a right-handed batsman who bowls right-arm off break  He was born at Bromley, Kent.

Sheen represented the Kent Cricket Board in List A cricket.  His debut List A match came against Denmark in the 1999 NatWest Trophy.  From 1999 to 2001, he represented the Board in 5 List A matches, the last of which came against Buckinghamshire in the 2001 Cheltenham & Gloucester Trophy.  In his 5 List A matches, he scored 70 runs at a batting average of 23.33, with a high score of 45.  With the ball he took 7 wickets at a bowling average of 20.85, with best figures of 2/31.

He currently plays club cricket for Bromley Cricket Club in the Kent Cricket League.

References

External links
Grant Sheen at Cricinfo
Grant Sheen at CricketArchive

1974 births
Living people
People from Bromley
English cricketers
Kent Cricket Board cricketers